Janghwa Hongryeonjeon (literally The Story of Janghwa and Hongryeon) is 1956 South Korean horror film. The film is based on a popular Korean fairy tale "Janghwa Hongryeon jeon" which had been adapted into film versions in 1924, 1936, 1956, 1962, 1972, 2003, and 2009.

Synopsis
Janghwa Hongreonjeon is film based on a popular Korean fairy tale which had been previously filmed in 1924, 1936, and later filmed again in 1962, and 1972. Director Kim Jee-woon used the story as the basis of his 2003 film, A Tale of Two Sisters.

Cast
 Kyeong-hie Lee
 Yeong-ran Seo
 Sok-Yang Choo
 Geum-seong Seok
 Wol-yeong Seo

References

External links
 

South Korean horror films
1956 films
1956 horror films
1950s Korean-language films
Films based on fairy tales
Films directed by Jeong Chang-hwa
South Korean black-and-white films